Penn Island is an uninhabited island of the Weddell Island Group in the Falkland Islands. It lies north of Weddell Island, northeast of Beaver Island and west of Barclay Island.

Maps
 The Falkland Islands. Scale 1:401280 map. London: Edward Stanford, 1901
 Falkland Islands Explorer Map. Scale 1:365000. Ocean Explorer Maps, 2007
 Falklands Topographic Map Series. Scale 1:50000, 29 sheets. DOS 453, 1961-1979
 Falkland Islands. Scale 1:643000 Map. DOS 906. Edition 3-OS, 1998
 Map 500k--xm20-4. 1:500000 map of Weddell Island and part of West Falkland. Russian Army Maps (for the world)

References

Islands of the Falkland Islands
Uninhabited islands of the Falkland Islands